Martin Luther King Jr. (1929–1968) was a minister and civil rights activist.

Martin Luther King may also refer to:

People
Martin Luther King Sr. (1899–1984), Baptist minister and father of Martin Luther King Jr.
Martin Luther King III (born 1957), son of Martin Luther King Jr. and a former head of the Southern Christian Leadership Conference

Places
 Martin Luther King station (disambiguation), stations of the name
 Martin Luther King Street, see List of streets named after Martin Luther King Jr.
Martin Luther King Jr. East Busway
Martin Luther King Jr. Avenue
Martin Luther King Jr. Boulevard (disambiguation)
Martin Luther King Jr. Drive (disambiguation)
Martin Luther King Jr. Expressway (disambiguation)
Martin Luther King Jr. Parkway (disambiguation)
Martin Luther King Jr. Way (disambiguation)
 Martin Luther King School
 Martin Luther King High School (disambiguation)
 Martin Luther King Middle School (disambiguation)
 Lycée Martin Luther King (disambiguation)

Others
 Bust of Martin Luther King (disambiguation)
 Statue of Martin Luther King (disambiguation)

See also

 
 Martin Luther King Jr. Day
 Martin Luther (disambiguation)
 MLK (disambiguation)